Bartolomeu is a given name of Portuguese, Galician or Romanian origin. It is a cognate of Bartholomew. Notable people with this name include:

 Bartolomeu Anania – a Romanian Orthodox monk who was the Metropolitan of Cluj (1993–2011)
 Bartolomeu Cid dos Santos
 Bartolomeu de Gusmão
 Bartolomeu Dias
 Bartolomeu Perestrello – 1st Capitão Donatário, Lord and Governor of the Island of Porto Santo (c. 1395–1457)
 Bartolomeu Português – a Portuguese buccaneer
 Bartolomeu Velho – a sixteenth-century Portuguese mapmaker and cosmographer
 Edgar Bartolomeu – a former Angolan professional soccer player

See also 
 
 
 Barthélemy – French
 Bartholomew – English
 Bartolomeo – Italian
 Bartolomé – Spanish
 São Bartolomeu (disambiguation)
 São Bartolomeu de Messines – a Portuguese Parish in the Municipality (Concelho ) of Silves
 São Bartolomeu de Regatos – a parish in the district of Angra do Heroísmo in the Azores

References 

Romanian masculine given names
Portuguese masculine given names